Chong Zhemin is a Malaysian politician who has served as Member of Parliament (MP) for Kampar since November 2022. He served as Member of the Perak State Legislative Assembly for Keranji from May 2018 to November 2022. He is a member of the Democratic Action Party (DAP), a component party of the Pakatan Harapan (PH) coalition. He is the Chief of Economic Development Bureau of DAP of	Perak and was the Political Secretary to National Vice Chairman, Parliamentary Leader and State Chairman of DAP of Perak Nga Kor Ming.

Election result

References

External links 
 

Living people

21st-century Malaysian politicians
Democratic Action Party (Malaysia) politicians
Members of the Perak State Legislative Assembly
Malaysian people of Chinese descent
Malaysian politicians of Chinese descent
Year of birth missing (living people)